The Kirkuk Provincial Council is the provincial council of the Kirkuk Governorate, based in Kirkuk, Iraq.

History 
Its inaugural session was dedicated to having the introduction of its new members then followed by the oath ceremony that was supervised by Judge Thahir Hamza Salman, the head of Kirkuk Appellate Court.

KPC has emphasized promoting the brotherhood spirits and establishing the principles of equality and common work in order to provide services to citizens of the province impartially, in spite of the conspiracies and intimidations of the terrorists, the unbelievers and agents who are the enemies of our people and who attempt in vain to spoil the democratic change process in building the state of law and civil society, and who try to provoke the sectarianism and to create sedition among diverse communities in Kirkuk province.

Because of the common goals in the electoral agendas of the different electoral lists, KPC has prioritized a list of aims to be accomplished: reconstruction, secure the settlement, promoting the rule of law, improve the works of the government departments and institutions, providing equal job opportunities, improving the living of the citizens and developing the basic services in education, health and other fields.

Boycott and Power Sharing 

In November 2006, Arab and Turkomen members of the council withdrew, claiming that the Kurdish majority, which holds 26 of the 41 seats on the council, had excluded them from decision-making and governance. Arab members returned to the council in December 2007 after a new power-sharing deal was agreed.

Committees 

The council has formed a number of committees.

The principle of consensus, which was adopted by the Iraqi National Assembly in forming its committees and in forming the Iraqi Transitional Government, has been adopted by KPC in forming its committees. One of the committees is Article 58 and the Victims of Ethnic Cleansing Policies Committee to follow up the procedures of normalizing the situation in Kirkuk Province according to the new Iraqi Constitution.

Human rights committee 
When in early 2013, a survey conducted by Iraqi women's organization Pana and Iraqi-German NGO WADI revealed a still high prevalence of female genital mutilation of 38% in Kirkuk province, the provincial council's Human rights committee disputed the data, decrying a loss of reputation.

Members

References 

Kirkuk
Kirkuk Governorate
Government of Iraq